Takenibeia Toromon (born ) is a I-Kiribati male weightlifter, competing in the 69 kg category and representing Kiribati at international competitions. He participated at the 2010 Commonwealth Games in the 69 kg event. He is the holder of Kiribati records in Olympic weightlifting.  He won the bronze medal at the 2011 Pacific Games.

Major competitions

References

1992 births
Living people
I-Kiribati male weightlifters
Weightlifters at the 2010 Commonwealth Games
Commonwealth Games competitors for Kiribati
Place of birth missing (living people)
Weightlifters at the 2014 Commonwealth Games